Zac Elkin (born 21 June 1991 in Cape Town) is a South African cricketer, who played four games of first-class cricket for Cardiff MCCU. He won a gold medal with Team South Africa at the 2017 Maccabiah Games.

He made his List A debut for Western Province in the 2017–18 CSA Provincial One-Day Challenge on 11 February 2018.

References

1991 births
Living people
Cricketers from Cape Town
South African cricketers
Cardiff MCCU cricketers
Jewish South African sportspeople
Maccabiah Games competitors for South Africa
Maccabiah Games medalists in cricket
Maccabiah Games gold medalists for South Africa
Western Province cricketers